Xieji is a town under the administration of Gaozhou City in southwestern Guangdong province, China, located about  east of downtown Gaozhou. , it has one residential community (居委会) and 19 villages under its administration.

See also
List of township-level divisions of Guangdong

References

Township-level divisions of Guangdong